Cappawhite GAA is a Gaelic Athletic Association club is located in the village of Cappawhite, County Tipperary, bordering on County Limerick in Ireland. It competes in the West Division Gaelic football and hurling competitions of Tipperary GAA. The club's tradition is in hurling, having won major honours through the decades. However, the club achieved major football success in the 1970s when the West Division Senior Football championship was also won.

Cappawhite's famous full-back of yesteryear, John Kelly was Tipperary' No.3 when they won the County's 22nd All-Ireland championship in 1971 and he also figured on the University College Cork Senior team that won the Fitzgibbon Cup (Inter-varsities Championship.

Hurling

Honours
Tipperary Senior Hurling Championship (1)
 1987
Tipperary U-21 'A' Hurling Championship (1)
 1977 (with Éire Óg), 1999
West Tipperary Senior Hurling Championship (8)
 1962, 1983, 1984, 1985, 1987, 2000, 2001, 2005
 Tipperary Junior A Hurling Championship (2)
 1942, 1948
 West Tipperary Junior A Hurling Championship (8)
 1942, 1948, 1957, 1961, 1982, 1985, 1988, 2006
 South Tipperary Junior A Hurling Championship (1)
 1913
 West Tipperary Junior B Hurling Championship (3)
 1997, 1998, 1999
West Tipperary U-21 'A' Hurling Championship (12)
 1962 (with Éire Óg), 1965, 1968, 1974 (with Solohead), 1975 (with Solohead), 1977 (with Éire Óg), 1978 (with Éire Óg), 1980 (with Éire Óg), 1997, 1999, 2015 (with Sean Treacy's), 2016 (with Sean Treacy's)
West Tipperary U-21 'B' Hurling Championship (4)
 1995, 2005, 2008, 2014 (with Sean Treacy's)
 West Tipperary Minor A Hurling Championship (10)
 1934, 1935, 1957 (with Éire Óg), 1962 (with Éire Óg), 1965, 1966, 1971, 1977 (with Éire Óg), 1978 (with Éire Óg), 1995
 West Tipperary Minor B Hurling Championship (2)
 2007, 2008

Gaelic football

Honours
Tipperary Intermediate Football Championship (1)
 1990
Tipperary Junior Football Championship (2)
 1978, 2008
West Tipperary Intermediate Football Championship (1)
 1990 
West Tipperary Junior Football Championship (5)
 1973, 1977, 2006, 2007, 2008
West Tipperary Junior B Football Championship (1)
 2022
 West Tipperary Under-21 A Football Championship (1)
 1981 (with Éire Óg)
 West Tipperary Under-21 B Football Championship (1)
 1996
 West Tipperary Minor B Football Championship (4)
 1985, 1994, 1997, 2003

Notable players
 John Kelly
 Ger O'Neill
 Eugene O'Neill (hurler)

References

External links
Tipperary GAA site

Gaelic games clubs in County Tipperary
Hurling clubs in County Tipperary
Gaelic football clubs in County Tipperary